William Henry Wills (October 26, 1882 – March 6, 1946) was an American politician from the U.S. state of Vermont. He was the 61st lieutenant governor of Vermont from 1937 to 1941 and the 65th governor of Vermont from 1941 to 1945. In 1944, Wills was a delegate to the Republican National Convention.

Biography
William Henry Wills was born in Chicago, Illinois, where his family lived for the first ten years of his life. When his father, James Henry Wills, died, his mother Alzina moved to Vergennes, Vermont, to live near relatives, and he lived there for eight years. At eighteen, he moved to Bennington, where he worked at several occupations, including selling shoes. He was married to Hazel McLeod and they had one child.

Career
Wills started an insurance company in 1915, and was also involved in other financial services.  He got into electoral politics in the 1920s, winning election to the Vermont House of Representatives in 1928, representing Bennington; he won the Bennington County Senate seat in the following election (1930), and was chosen president pro tempore of that body.  Wills chose to run for lieutenant governor in 1932, but lost the nomination to Charles Manley Smith. Returning to the Senate in the 1934 election, Wills was again elected president pro tempore of the Vermont State Senate. In 1936, Wills again ran for lieutenant governor, this time winning the election to succeed George Aiken (who was elected governor), and won again in 1938.

Wills was elected governor in 1940, succeeding Aiken, who chose to run for the United States Senate. He won again in 1942, but chose not to seek a third term, citing poor health. Among the policies he successfully championed as governor were the institution of a merit system for state employees and a minimum wage for teachers.  He was succeeded by Lieutenant Governor Mortimer R. Proctor.  By the time he left office, Wills had received honorary LL.D. degrees from Norwich University and the University of Vermont. He was president of the board of trustees of the Episcopal Diocese of Vermont.  He was also on the board of a number of other charities, and was a Freemason, an Elk, and an Odd Fellow. He was a delegate to the 1944 Republican National Convention.

Wills was nominated by President Harry Truman to replace Federal Communications Commission member Norman S. Case on June 13, 1945, for the seven-year term beginning July 1, 1945.  Wills was confirmed on unanimous consent by the Senate on July 12, a few hours after a brief hearing before the Senate Interstate Commerce committee, and he took the oath of office on July 23, 1945.

Death
Wills served until his death the following year, while presiding over an FCC hearing in Brockton, Massachusetts. He is interred at Park Lawn Cemetery, Bennington, Vermont.

References

External links
 
 National Governors Association
The Political Graveyard

Wills, William H.
Wills, William H.
Wills, William H.
Republican Party members of the Vermont House of Representatives
Republican Party Vermont state senators
Presidents pro tempore of the Vermont Senate
Politicians from Chicago
People from Bennington, Vermont
Businesspeople from Vermont
Members of the Federal Communications Commission
Norwich University alumni
Republican Party governors of Vermont
20th-century American politicians
Burials in Vermont
20th-century American businesspeople